Loburn is a rural community in North Canterbury, New Zealand. It is located ten kilometres northwest of Rangiora and nearly 50 kilometres north of Christchurch.

Loburn is a small community, with no shops. Local industries include a cheese factory and orchards.  Farms in the community include those raising sheep, cattle and emu.

Geography
Loburn is located close to the northernmost extreme of the Canterbury Plains. It is bounded to the south and west by the Ashley and Okuku rivers, respectively. To the north it is bounded by the foothills,  Mount Grey / Maukatere (933m)  and Mt Karetu (972m)   and bounded to the east by the Ashley forest.

The Loburn-Ashley fault zone is located from the northern banks of the Ashley River through to about Hodgsons road in the north, it runs parallel to the Ashley river. The Loburn fault, which runs along the south side of Hodgsons Road, is responsible for various terraced abandoned stream channels, wedge structures and scarps, notably Round Hill. The topography in Loburn is generally flat with gently rolling hills, altitude gradually decreases southwards from the foothills.

Education

Loburn has two schools.

Loburn School (est. 1869) is a decile 9 state co-educational primary school with a role of 

North Loburn School (est. 1882) is a decile 9 state co-educational primary school with a role of

Demographics

Loburn had a population of 2,175 at the 2018 New Zealand census, an increase of 234 people (12.1%) since the 2013 census, and an increase of 837 people (62.6%) since the 2006 census. There were 735 households. There were 1,098 males and 1,077 females, giving a sex ratio of 1.02 males per female. The median age was 45.4 years (compared with 37.4 years nationally), with 414 people (19.0%) aged under 15 years, 339 (15.6%) aged 15 to 29, 1,149 (52.8%) aged 30 to 64, and 273 (12.6%) aged 65 or older.

Ethnicities were 95.7% European/Pākehā, 6.2% Māori, 1.4% Pacific peoples, 1.5% Asian, and 1.8% other ethnicities (totals add to more than 100% since people could identify with multiple ethnicities).

The proportion of people born overseas was 20.7%, compared with 27.1% nationally.

Although some people objected to giving their religion, 57.4% had no religion, 32.7% were Christian, 0.3% were Hindu, 0.3% were Buddhist and 1.7% had other religions.

Of those at least 15 years old, 339 (19.3%) people had a bachelor or higher degree, and 270 (15.3%) people had no formal qualifications. The median income was $36,900, compared with $31,800 nationally. The employment status of those at least 15 was that 942 (53.5%) people were employed full-time, 348 (19.8%) were part-time, and 57 (3.2%) were unemployed.

References

Waimakariri District
Populated places in Canterbury, New Zealand